Dear Vaappi is an Indian Malayalam Language film directed by Shan Thulasi . It stars Lal, Niranj Maniyanpilla Raju,  Anagha Narayanan while Sri Rekha, Jagadish, Maniyanpilla Raju, Sunil Sukhada, Jayakrishnan, Chembil Ashokan, Nirmal Palazhi, Neena Kurup etc. play supporting roles. Kailas Menon has composed 5 songs for the movie.

Plot
Amira's (Anagha Narayanan) father Basheer (Lal) comes back to his hometown after 30 years of tailoring work in Mumbai and wanted to start his own business in hometown. The story is about the daughter Amira who supports his father for the venture and wanted to see her father's dream come true.

Cast

Lal
Niranj Maniyanpilla Raju
Anagha Narayanan
Sri Rekha
Jagadish
Maniyanpilla Raju
Sunil Sukhada
Jayakrishnan
Chembil Ashokan
Nirmal Palazhi
Neena Kurup

References

2020s Malayalam-language films
2023 films